Karalam is a small village in Thrissur district in Kerala state of India, known for its scenic beauty. It is located 8 km from Irinjalakuda and 18 km from Thrissur.

Economy

Agriculture is the primary industry, but many households have at least one member working abroad, often in the Gulf.

Transport

Bus service connects the village with nearby cities like Thrissur and Irinjalakuda.
Buses to Karalam starts from Irinjalakuda Bus Station. Only private buses service to this area. Bus time to Karalam from Irinjalakuda via Kizhuthani are (AM) 6.00, 6.50, 7.50, 8.30, 9.05, 10.00, 10.40, 11.20, 12.05(PM), 12.20, 1.05, 1.45, 2.45, 3.25, 4.00, 5.00, 5.35, 6.15, 6.30, 7.30.

Colleges and schools

 Karalam Lower Primary School
 Rajarshy M L P S, Kizhuthani
 Vellani L P S
 Karalam Vocational Higher Secondary School
 Tharananellur Arts and Science College,
 St. Dominic school Vellani
 Vimala central school Thanissery

Healthcare
Family  health centre - Pullathara, Karalam

Landmarks

Kumaranchira temple

Karalam is famous for its Kumaranchira temple. Only Hindus may enter the temple, but members of other religions also believe in Kumaranchira Bhagavathy (Deity) up to a certain extent and send their offerings to the temple through their Hindu friends or neighbours. The deity is believed to be the sister of the famous Kodungallur bhagavathy.

Karuvannur Puzha
This beautiful River marks the northern boundary of Karalam Panchayat.
This River is the main source of water for Agriculture in the Village.

Holy Trinity Church

The only Church in Thrissur District in the name of Holy Trinity.

Karalam Mosque

Karalam Muslim juma masjid

Festivals

 Kumaranchira temple Bharani utsavam (festival) in March which lasts for 2 days.
 Pindi Perunnal in January, second week, every year which lasts for three days.
Karalam Chandanakudam, March 14 , every year.

References

http://www.education.kerala.gov.in/schoollist.htm

http://thrissur.nic.in/mukundapuramvillages.asp

http://lsgkerala.in/karalampanchayat

http://www.trend.kerala.gov.in

Census Data 2001

Villages in Mukundapuram Taluk